Barbarano may refer to:

 Barbarano Mossano, comune in the Province of Vicenza in the Italian region Veneto
 Barbarano Romano, comune  in the Province of Viterbo in the Italian region Latium
 Barbarano Vicentino, frazione of the comune of Barbarano Mossano, in the province of Vicenza, Veneto, north-eastern Italy